The Alex Cross film series is an American film series of three thriller films, based on the fictional character Alex Cross, who originally appeared in a series of novels of the same name by James Patterson. In the film series, Morgan Freeman and Tyler Perry have portrayed Alex Cross.

Films
 Kiss the Girls (1997)
 Along Came a Spider (2001)
 Alex Cross (2012)

Cancelled sequel
Prior to the film Alex Cross (2012) release, Double Cross was scheduled to be adapted into a film, with Tyler Perry reprising the role, but the film was cancelled after Alex Cross did not perform well at the box office.

Cast

Crew

Reception

Box office performance

Critical and public response

References

External links

American film series
Film series introduced in 1997
Trilogies